Kochubeyevskoye is a rural locality (a selo) and the administrative center of Kochubeyevsky District in Stavropol Krai, Russia, located on the Kuban River. Population:

References

Rural localities in Stavropol Krai